The 2021 All-Ireland Minor Hurling Championship was the 91st staging of the All-Ireland Minor Hurling Championship since its establishment by the Gaelic Athletic Association in 1928. The championship began on 30 June 2021 and ended on 21 August 2021.

The 2021 championship was the first in over 90 years to begin before the previous year's championship had concluded. The number of participating teams also increased, with Down and Meath joining the Leinster Championship. Galway entered the championship as the defending champions in search of a fifth successive title.

The final, the first to be played at Semple Stadium in Thurles in over 30 years, was played on 21 August 2021 between Cork and Galway, in what was their first meeting in a final in four years. Cork won the match by 1-23 to 0-12 to claim their 19th championship title overall and their first title since 2001.

Cork's Jack Leahy was the championship's top scorer with 4-41.

Results

Leinster Minor Hurling Championship

Leinster round 1

Leinster round 2

Leinster quarter-finals

Leinster semi-finals

Leinster final

Munster Minor Hurling Championship

Munster quarter-finals

Munster semi-finals

Munster final

All-Ireland Minor Hurling Championship

All-Ireland semi-final

All-Ireland final

Championship statistics

Top scorers

Top scorer overall

In a single game

References

Minor
All-Ireland Minor Hurling Championship